Jossa may refer to:

Places 
 Jossa (Fulda), a river of Hesse, Germany, tributary of the Fulda
 Jossa (Lüder), a river of Hesse, Germany, tributary of the Lüder
 Jossa (Sinn), a river of Hesse, Germany, tributary of the Sinn
 Jossa (Sinntal), a village in Hesse, Germany

People 
 Jacqueline Jossa (born 1992), English actress
 Megan Jossa (born 1996), English actress